Fogliano Redipuglia  is a comune (municipality)  in the Italian region Friuli-Venezia Giulia, located about  northwest of Trieste and about  southwest of Gorizia.

Fogliano Redipuglia borders the following municipalities: Doberdò del Lago, Gradisca d'Isonzo, Ronchi dei Legionari, Sagrado, San Pier d'Isonzo, Villesse.

World War I memorial 

Fogliano Redipuglia lies at the eastern end of the shifting front of the Italian Campaign against Austria-Hungary (and Germany) in World War I, and today is home to Italy's largest war memorial on Monte Sei Busi in Redipuglia.

The huge war memorial from 1938 contains the corpses of 39,857 identified Italian soldiers, and 69,330 unidentified. In a nearby cemetery are buried another around 14,000 Austro-Hungarian soldiers. Trench fortifications can be seen next to the war memorial, as well as a display of large World War I artillery pieces.

Pope Francis visited Redipuglia's military memorial on 13 September 2014 to mark the centenary of World War I to pray for those who died in all wars.

References

External links
 Virtual tour of the monument with 360° surround photography - (time of the visualization: March 2014) 

Cities and towns in Friuli-Venezia Giulia